Andreas Hellum (born 19 November 1997) is a Norwegian footballer who plays as a forward for Arendal.

Career
His childhood club was IF Birkebeineren, whence he moved to Mjøndalen at the age of 13. Making his senior debut for Mjøndalen in 2016, even scoring a goal, and playing several dozens of 1. divisjon games, Hellum was at times deemed surplus to requirements and loaned out to Asker in 2016, Nybergsund in 2018 and Strømmen in 2019. He then returned to play the 2020 Eliteserien opener. His only Eliteserien goal came in 2020 against Brann. After the season he was released, and joined Arendal in the Norwegian Second Division.

References

1997 births
Living people
People from Nedre Eiker
Norwegian footballers
Mjøndalen IF players
Asker Fotball players
Nybergsund IL players
Strømmen IF players
Arendal Fotball players
Norwegian Second Division players
Norwegian First Division players
Eliteserien players
Association football forwards
Sportspeople from Viken (county)